Sam Spiegel may refer to:

 Sam Spiegel (1901–1985), film producer
 Sam Spiegel (actor) (born 1963), French actor
 Sam Spiegel (musician), American musician and DJ